The Aksu River (means "white/clear water" in Uyghur and Kyrgyz languages) is a transboundary river in the Xinjiang province in China and Ak-Suu District of Issyk-Kul Province of Kyrgyzstan. Its upper section in Kyrgyzstan is known as the Saryjaz River or Sarydzhaz River. The middle section, between the Kyrgyz-Chinese border and the confluence with the Toshkan, is called Kumarik River. The Aksu is the only one of the Tarim's source rivers to run throughout the year.

Course
The river takes its roots at the Semyonov glacier in the Central Tian Shan mountains of Kyrgyzstan, close to the tripoint with Kazakhstan and China. From here it first runs towards the west, before turning south and breaking through the high mountains and into Xinjiang in the northern parts of the Tarim Basin. At the city of Aksu it meets its main tributary, the Toshkan (Kakshaal), which flows in from the west. After the confluence the river continues south and enters the northern edge of the Taklamakan Desert, where it joins the Tarim River.

The main tributaries, from source to mouth, are:
Köölü (right)
Engilchek (left)
Terekti (right)
Kayyngdy (left)
Üchköl (right)
Ak-Shyyrak (right)
Köykap (left)
Jaman-Suu (left)
Jangy-Jer (left)
Temirsuu (left)
Toshkan (Kakshaal) (right)

References

Rivers of Xinjiang
Rivers of Kyrgyzstan
International rivers of Asia
Sites along the Silk Road